St Charles Catholic Sixth Form College is a Roman Catholic sixth form college located in the Royal Borough of Kensington and Chelsea, in Central London, England. It was originally Cardinal Manning Boys School, founded in 1955 and became St Charles Catholic Sixth Form College in 1990 following a reorganisation of the Catholic education system within the Archdiocese. It is part of a cluster of Catholic institutions located at St Charles Square which includes Sion Manning Roman Catholic Girls' School, St Charles Primary School, a church and a Carmelite convent.

The college offers a range of courses for students graduating from local schools in the surrounding area. These courses include GCSEs, A Levels and BTECs.

References

External links
 St Charles Catholic Sixth Form College homepage

Education in the Royal Borough of Kensington and Chelsea
Sixth form colleges in London
E
Educational institutions established in 1955
1955 establishments in England
Catholic Church in London
Catholic secondary schools in the Archdiocese of Westminster